Blaine Anthony Knight (born June 28, 1996) is an American professional baseball pitcher in the Baltimore Orioles organization.

Ameteur career 
Knight attended and graduated from Bryant High School in Bryant, Arkansas. In 2014, as a junior, he was 11–0 with a 0.49 ERA, helping lead Bryant to a state title. As a senior in 2015 he compiled a 6–2 record and 1.34 ERA while striking out 77 batters and walking only four in  innings pitched. He was not drafted out of high school in the 2015 Major League Baseball draft and enrolled at the University of Arkansas to play college baseball for the Arkansas Razorbacks.

As a freshman at Arkansas in 2016, Knight made 18 appearances on the mound (seven starts), compiled a 2.98 ERA and struck out 46 batters in  innings pitched for the Razorbacks. In 2017, as a sophomore, he was the Razorbacks number one starter, and in April was named to the midseason watch list for Golden Spikes Award, an award given annually to the best amateur baseball player in the United States, after compiling a 5–1 record and 1.94 ERA in eight starts. Knight finished the season with an 8–4 record and 3.28 ERA in  innings. After the season, he was drafted by the Texas Rangers in the 29th round of the 2017 Major League Baseball draft but did not sign and returned to Arkansas. In 2018, as a junior, Knight was named to the All-SEC Second Team, and to the College World Series All-Tournament Team. He finished his 2018 season with a 14-0 record and a 2.80 ERA over 19 starts.

Professional career 
Knight was selected by the Baltimore Orioles in the third round (87th overall) in the 2018 Major League Baseball draft, and he signed for $1.1 million. He made his professional debut with the Aberdeen IronBirds of the Class A-Short Season New York-Penn League and spent the remainder of 2018 there, posting a 0-1 record with a 2.61 ERA in four starts. Knight began 2019 with the Delmarva Shorebirds of the Class A South Atlantic League and was their Opening Day starter. He was promoted to the Frederick Keys of the Class A-Advanced Carolina League after posting a 3-0 record with a 0.68 ERA and 33 strikeouts in five starts (26 innings pitched) with Delmarva. Over 18 games (17 starts) with Frederick, Knight went 1-12 with a 6.13 ERA, striking out 56 and walking 39 over  innings.

Knight did not play a minor league game in 2020 due to the cancellation of the minor league season caused by the COVID-19 pandemic. To begin the 2021 season, he was assigned to Aberdeen, new members of the High-A East. He was promoted to the Bowie Baysox of the Double-A Northeast in early June, and earned another promotion to the Norfolk Tides of the Triple-A East in mid-August. Over 22 games (13 starts) between the three clubs, Knight went 3-6 with a 5.40 ERA and 71 strikeouts over  innings. He returned to Norfolk for the 2022 season. Over 34 games (seven starts), he went 4-4 with a 7.38 ERA and seventy strikeouts over 72 innings.

Personal life
Knight and his wife, Rachel (a former catcher for the Arkansas Razorbacks softball team), married in 2019. Their first child, a son, was born in 2021.

References

External links 

Arkansas Razorbacks bio

Minor league baseball players
1996 births
Living people
Baseball pitchers
Baseball players from Arkansas
Arkansas Razorbacks baseball players
Delmarva Shorebirds players
Aberdeen IronBirds players
Frederick Keys players
Bowie Baysox players
Norfolk Tides players